This article displays the squads for the 1993 World Women's Handball Championship in Norway.

Group A

Hungary

Norway

Poland

Spain

Group B

Denmark

Lithuania

Russia

South Korea

Group C

Angola

Germany

Romania

Sweden

Group D

Austria

China

Czechoslovakia

United States

References 

World Women's Handball Championship squads
World Handball Championship squads